Economic interventionism, sometimes also called state interventionism, is an economic policy position favouring government intervention in the market process with the intention of correcting market failures and promoting the general welfare of the people. An economic intervention is an action taken by a government or international institution in a market economy in an effort to impact the economy beyond the basic regulation of fraud, enforcement of contracts, and provision of public goods and services. Economic intervention can be aimed at a variety of political or economic objectives, such as promoting economic growth, increasing employment, raising wages, raising or reducing prices, promoting income equality, managing the money supply and interest rates, increasing profits, or addressing market failures.

The term intervention is typically used by advocates of laissez-faire and free market capitalism. The state is inherently different from the private market economy because of the state's legislative, judicial and use of force monopoly as defined by the administrative law, while the private market is the result of individually operating legal entities primarily subject to property law, contract law and tort law. The terminology applies to capitalist market-based economies where government actions interrupt the market forces at play through corporate welfare like subsidies, regulation like price controls and state-created cartels (like the central banks or the economically totalitarian medical welfare state) and state-owned enterprises. Note that the result of regulation or government created cartels may no longer be either capitalism or a market economy. Note that regulation law should not be confused with regulatory law and does include the regulation in the US code, like Pure Food and Drug Act which is statutory law, as well as the regulation in the Code of Federal Regulations. From the point of view of the liberal model of government which always consists of a market economy, the material public law contains the legal obligations enforceable by government on private entities called regulation law and criminal law and conversely the legal obligations enforceable by private entities on government called the constitutional and administrative law.

Capitalist market economies that feature high degrees of state intervention are often referred to as a type of mixed economy.

Political perspectives 

Liberals and other advocates of free market or laissez-faire economics generally view government interventions as harmful due to the law of unintended consequences, belief in government's inability to effectively manage economic concerns and other considerations. However, modern liberals (in the United States) and contemporary social democrats (in Europe) are inclined to support interventionism, seeing state economic interventions as an important means of promoting greater income equality and social welfare. Furthermore, many center-right groups such as Gaullists, paternalistic conservatives and Christian democrats also support state economic interventionism to promote social order and stability. National-conservatives also frequently support economic interventionism as a means of protecting the power and wealth of a country or its people, particularly via advantages granted to industries seen as nationally vital. Such government interventions are usually undertaken when potential benefits outweigh the external costs.

On the other hand, Marxists often feel that interventions in the form of social welfare policies might interfere with the goal of replacing capitalism with socialism because a developed welfare state makes capitalism more tolerable to the average worker, thereby perpetuating the continued existence of capitalism to society's detriment. Socialists often criticize interventionism (as supported by social democrats and social liberals) as being untenable and liable to cause more economic distortion in the long-run. While interventions might solve single issues in the short term, they cause distortions and hamper the efficiency of the capitalist economy. From this perspective, any attempt to patch up capitalism's contradictions would lead to distortions in the economy elsewhere, with the only lasting solution being the replacement of capitalism with a socialist economy.

Effects 

The effects of government economic interventionism are widely disputed.

Regulatory authorities do not consistently close markets, yet as seen in economic liberalization efforts by states and various institutions (International Monetary Fund and World Bank) in Latin America, "financial liberalization and privatization coincided with democratization". One study suggests that after the lost decade an increasing "diffusion of regulatory authorities" emerged and these actors engaged in restructuring the economies within Latin America. Through the 1980s, Latin America had undergone a debt crisis and hyperinflation (during 1989 and 1990). These international stakeholders restricted the state's economic leverage and bound it in contract to co-operate. After multiple projects and years of failed attempts for the Argentine state to comply, the renewal and intervention seemed stalled. Two key intervention factors that instigated economic progress in Argentina were substantially increasing privatization and the establishment of a currency board. This exemplifies global institutions, including the International Monetary Fund and the World Bank, to instigate and propagate openness to increase foreign investments and economic development within places, including Latin America.

In Western countries, government officials theoretically weigh the cost benefit for an intervention for the population or they succumb beneath coercion by a third private party and must take action. Intervention for economic development is also at the discretion and self-interest of the stake holders, the multifarious interpretations of progress and development theory. To illustrate this, the government and international institutions did not prop up Lehman Brothers during the financial crisis of 2007–2008, therefore allowing the company to file bankruptcy. Days later, when American International Group waned towards collapsing, the state spent public money to keep it from falling. These corporations have interconnected interests with the state, therefore their incentive is to influence the government to designate regulatory policies that will not inhibit their accumulation of assets. In Japan, Abenomics is a form of intervention with respect to Prime Minister Shinzō Abe's desire to restore the country's former glory in the midst of a globalized economy.

United States government interventions

President Richard Nixon signed amendments to the Clean Air Act in 1970 that expanded it to mandate state and federal regulation of both automobiles and industry. It was further amended in 1977 and 1990. One of the first modern environmental protection laws enacted in the United States was the National Environmental Policy Act of 1969 (NEPA), which requires the government to consider the impact of its actions or policies on the environment. NEPA remains one of the most commonly used environmental laws in the nation. In addition to NEPA, there are numerous pollution-control statutes that apply to such specific environmental media as air and water. The best known of these laws are the Clean Air Act (CAA), Clean Water Act (CWA), and the Comprehensive Environmental Response, Compensation, and Liability Act (CERCLA) commonly referred to as Superfund. Among the many other important pollution control laws are the Resource Conservation and Recovery Act (RCRA), Toxic Substances Control Act (TSCA), Oil Pollution Prevention Act (OPP), Emergency Planning and Community Right-to-Know Act (EPCRA), and the Pollution Prevention Act (PPA). 

United States pollution control statutes tend to be numerous and diverse and many of the environmental statutes passed by Congress are aimed at pollution prevention. However, they often need to be expanded and updated before their impact is fully realized. Pollution-control laws are generally too broad to be managed by existing legal bodies, so Congress must find or create an agency for each that will be able to implement the mandated mission effectively.

During World War I, the United States government intervention mandated that the manufacturing of cars be replaced with machinery to successfully fight the war. Government intervention could be used to break the United States dependence on oil by mandating American automakers to produce electric cars such as the Chevrolet Volt. Michigan Governor Jennifer Granholm said: "We need help from Congress", namely renewing the clean energy manufacturing tax credit and the tax incentives that make plug-ins cheaper to buy for consumers. It is possible that government mandated carbon taxes could be used to improve technology and make cars like the Volt more affordable to consumers. However, current bills suggest carbon prices would only add a few cents to the price of gasoline, which has negligible effects compared to what is needed to change fuel consumption. 

Washington is beginning to invest in car manufacturing industry by partially providing $6 billion in battery-related public and private investments since 2008 and the White House has taken credit for putting a down payment on the American battery industry that may reduce battery prices in the coming years. Currently, opponents believe that the carbon dioxide emissions tax the United States government introduced on new cars is unfair on consumers and looks like a revenue-raising fiscal intervention instead of limiting harm caused to the environment. A national fuel tax means everyone will pay the tax and the amount of tax each individual or company pays will be proportional to the emissions they generate. The more they drive, the more that they would need to pay. While this tax is supported by the motor manufacturers, stipulations confirmed by the National Treasury state that minibuses and midibuses will receive a special exclusion from the emissions tax on cars and light commercial vehicles which went into effect on 1 September 2010. This exclusion is because these taxi vehicles are used for public transport, which opponents of the tax disagree with.

During George W. Bush’s 2000 campaign, he promised to commit $2 billion over ten years to advance clean coal technology through research and development initiatives. According to Bush supporters, he fulfilled that promise in his fiscal year 2008 budget request, allocating $426 million for the Clean Coal Technology Program. During his administration, Congress passed the Energy Policy Act of 2005, funding research into carbon-capture technology to remove and bury the carbon in coal after it is burned. The coal industry received $9 billion in subsidies under the act as part of an initiative supposedly to reduce American dependence on foreign oil and reduce carbon emissions. This included $6.2 billion for new power plants, $1.1 billion in tax breaks to install pollution-control technology and another $1.1 billion to make coal a cost efficient fuel. The act also allowed redefinitions of coal processing, such as spraying on diesel or starch, to qualify them as "non-traditional", allowing coal producers to avoid paying $1.3 billion in taxes per year.

The Waxman-Markey bill, also called the American Clean Energy and Security Act, passed by the House Energy and Commerce Committee in 2010, targets dramatic  reductions after 2020, when the price of the permits would rise to further limit consumers' demand for -intensive goods and services. The legislation is targeting 83 percent reduction in  emissions from 2005 levels in the year 2050. A study by the Environmental Protection Agency estimates that the price of the permit would rise from about $20 a ton in 2020 to more than $75 a ton in 2050.

The Office of Management and Budget (OMB) shows that federal subsidies for coal in the United States were planned to be reduced significantly between 2011 and 2020, provided the budget passed through Congress and reduces four coal tax preferences, namely Expensing of Exploration and Development Costs, Percent Depletion for Hard Mineral Fossil Fuels, Royalty Taxation and Domestic Manufacturing Deduction for Hard Mineral Fossil Fuels. The fiscal 2011 budget proposed by the Obama administration would cut approximately $2.3 billion in coal subsidies during the next decade.

Forms of regulation and state-intervention

Market-driven medical welfare state

Insurance companies that are regulated to accept all customers or patients within the state-regulated public basic insurance policy, which requires egalitarian treatment of all customers or patients and reimbursement of all health care treatment prescribed by a gatekeeper medical doctor, covered by the policy and charged to a patient. This basic health care insurance policy may be obligatory for all residents in a country, effectively putting all residents on a market-driven medical welfare program, like for example in the Netherlands, where these insurance companies receive, from tax revenue, an additional leverage sum with respect to the premium of about a factor 9. This policy is known to be very effective at eliminating waiting lines in health care.

Related adversities:
 While this system allows for a broad private enterprise market of health care services offered only to public basic insurance policy prescribed patients, it has as a side-effect the driving out of health care offered to patient seeking individually contracted medical services without gatekeeper doctors prescription. It therefore eliminates the market economy in health care.
 The income of people working in the market-driven welfare state consisting of the public health care policy basic insurance, the corresponding insurance companies and the public health care service providers like public hospitals, private clinics and practices, which is based on mandatory premiums and state tax revenue contribution, does no longer directly depend on the forces of supply and demand, this works out particularly bad in country wide medical emergency situations, where the self-preservation of the medical welfare-state workers does not ultimately depend on servicing the patient customers. A principle that is firmly secured by Adam Smith's invisible hand serving the common good.

See also
 American School (economics)
 Austrian School
 Crowding out
 Deficit spending
 Developmentalism
 Dirigisme
 Indicative planning
 Keynesian economics
 Monetary policy
 National debt of the United States
 Regulatory economics
 Rent-seeking
 Sales tax

References

Further reading
 

Ideologies of capitalism
Libertarian theory
Economic policy
Market failure
Economic nationalism